"Here in My Heart" is a 1997 song written by Glen Ballard and James Newton Howard and performed by Chicago. Keyboardist Bill Champlin sings lead, with bassist Jason Scheff singing the bridge.

It was one of two new songs from the band's The Heart of Chicago 1967-1997 compilation album. "Here in My Heart" was the group's eighth and final number one on the Billboard Adult Contemporary chart, and also reached No. 59 on the Hot 100 Airplay chart.

Charts

Weekly charts

Year-end charts

See also
List of Billboard Adult Contemporary number ones of 1997

References

1997 singles
1997 songs
1990s ballads
Chicago (band) songs
Rock ballads
Songs written by Glen Ballard
Songs written by James Newton Howard